Polda (Cop) is a Czech television series that has been broadcast by Prima televize since October 23, 2016.

The Polda series tells the story of a lieutenant who returns to duty after twenty years in a coma. During that time, not only the world around him changed, but also his family situation. It is renewed for sixth season.

Cast
David Matásek as por. Bc. Michal Bříza
Igor Orozovič as por. Bc. Andrej Křížek
Vladimír Polívka as por. JUDr. Vojtěch Urban
Ondřej Pavelka as mjr. Mgr. Martin Fišer
Jana Kolesárová as kpt. PhDr. Mgr. Taťjana (Táňa) Hošková
Jiří Vyorálek as MUDr. Robert Mráz
Lenka Vlasáková as Eliška Břízová
Jitka Sedláčková as Vanda Nováková-Fišerová

References

External links 
Official site
IMDB site
ČSFD site

Czech crime television series
Czech comedy television series
2016 Czech television series debuts
Prima televize original programming